Mosawer Ahadi (born 8 March 2000) is an Afghan-born Finnish professional footballer who plays for EIF, as a winger.

Club career

Palloherko Keski-Uusimaa
Ahadi's first senior club was PKKU in the Kakkonen. He made his senior league debut for the club on 29 April 2017 in a 3-2 away victory over PEPO. He was subbed off after 68 minutes, to be replaced by Phondo Wälläri. He scored his first league goal for the club on 13 June 2017 in a 1-1 home draw with Klubi 04. His goal, scored in the 61st minute, made the score 1-1.

Honka
In December 2017, Ahadi moved to FC Honka in the Veikkausliiga, arriving alongside Felix Ferahyan and Youness Rahimi. He made his league debut for the club on 14 May 2018 in a short stint off the bench against VPS. He was subbed on for Kasperi Liikonen in the 88th minute. For the remainder of the season, Ahadi played with the Honka youth team, Honka Akatemia in the Kakkonen. He scored two goals in Honka Akatemia's 6-0 victory over KK-46 on 1 June 2018.

After coming back from loan at Ekenäs, Ahadi signed a contract extension with Honka for the 2019 season.

Ekenäs (loan)
In July 2018, Ahadi was loaned out to Ekenäs in the Ykkönen. He made his league debut for the club on 28 July 2018 in a 3-0 away victory over Jaro. He was subbed on for Hanson Boakai in the 77th minute.

HIFK
On 5 February 2021, he signed with HIFK for the 2021 season. In December 2021, the contract was extended for the 2022 season, with an option for 2023.

Return to EIF
On 12 August 2022, Ahadi returned to EIF until the end of the season.

International career
He made his first appearance for Finland U17s on 16 January 2017 in a 3-3 draw with Belarus U17s. He made two appearances in Finland's UEFA European U17 Championship qualification run. One came in a 6-2 away defeat to Germany U17s, and the other in a 5-0 away victory against Armenia U17s, in which he scored a goal in the 54th minute. He made his first appearance for Finland U18s on 4 September 2017 in a 3-2 home victory over Austria U18s.

References

2000 births
Sportspeople from Mazar-i-Sharif
Finnish people of Afghan descent
Living people
Afghan men's footballers
Finnish footballers
Finland youth international footballers
Association football wingers
Pallokerho Keski-Uusimaa players
FC Honka players
Pallohonka players
Ekenäs IF players
Järvenpään Palloseura players
FC Espoo players
HIFK Fotboll players
Kakkonen players
Ykkönen players
Veikkausliiga players